The 1967 McNeese State Cowboys football team was an American football team that represented McNeese State College (now known as McNeese State University) as a member of the Gulf States Conference (GSC) during the 1967 NCAA College Division football season. In their second year under head coach Jim Clark, the team compiled an overall record of 4–5 with a mark of 4–1 in conference play, and finished as GSC champion.

Schedule

References

McNeese State
McNeese Cowboys football seasons
McNeese State Cowboys football